The 2014 China Open was a professional ranking snooker tournament, that took place between 31 March and 6 April 2014 at the Beijing University Students' Gymnasium in Beijing, China. It was the eleventh ranking event of the 2013–14 season.

Ding Junhui won his 11th ranking title by defeating defending champion Neil Robertson 10–5 in the final, and became the sixth on the list of players with the most ranking titles behind Stephen Hendry (36 titles), Steve Davis (28), Ronnie O'Sullivan (26), John Higgins (25) and Mark Williams (18). Ding also equalled Hendry's record from 1990/1991 to win five ranking titles in a single season.

Prize fund
The total prize money of the event was raised to £478,000 from the previous year's £425,000. The breakdown of prize money for this year is shown below:

Winner: £85,000
Runner-up: £35,000
Semi-final: £21,000
Quarter-final: £12,500
Last 16: £8,000
Last 32: £6,500
Last 64: £3,000

Non-televised highest break: £0
Televised highest break: £2,000
Total: £478,000

Wildcard round
These matches were played in Beijing on 31 March 2014.

Main draw

Final

Qualifying
These matches were held between 16 and 18 February 2014 at The Capital Venue in Gloucester, England. All matches were best of 9 frames.

Century breaks

Qualifying stage centuries

 141, 137  Duane Jones
 136  Pankaj Advani
 135  Jimmy White
 134  John Higgins
 127  Michael Holt
 126, 123  Ryan Day
 122, 109  Alfie Burden
 118  David Morris
 117  Mike Dunn
 116  Shaun Murphy

 115  Anthony McGill
 113  Joel Walker
 112  Dominic Dale
 112  Mark Allen
 107  Mark Selby
 107  Ken Doherty
 103  Ricky Walden
 100  Rory McLeod
 100  David Grace

Televised stage centuries

 142  Xiao Guodong
 136  Li Hang
 133  Barry Pinches
 130  David Morris
 129, 104  Yu Delu
 129  Tian Pengfei
 128  Duane Jones
 127  Ryan Day
 126, 119  Peter Ebdon

 124, 119, 104  Ding Junhui
 117  Hammad Miah
 115, 103  John Higgins
 110  Jimmy White
 109  Michael White
 106  Ali Carter
 102  Neil Robertson
 100  Ricky Walden

References

External links
 2014 China Open – Pictures by Tai Chengzhe at Facebook

China Open (snooker)
China Open
Open (snooker)
Sports competitions in Beijing
China Open
China Open